Martin C. Wittig (born 20 January 1964) was  the German CEO of the management consultant firm Roland Berger Strategy Consultants. He is the successor/antecessor of CEO Burkhard Schwenker. Martin Christof Wittig is married and lives with his wife and his two sons near Zurich (Switzerland).

Life 
Martin C. Wittig studied Mining and Business Administration at RWTH Aachen University (Germany) and worked as a miner for two years. With a thesis about investment planning, he achieved his PhD summa cum laude at the Technical University of Berlin. At this time, he held lectures at the TU Berlin.

In 1995, he joined Roland Berger Strategy Consultants and became an associate partner in 1999 and a full partner in 2000. Since January 2001, he has been acting as managing partner and director of the branch in Zurich.

In December 2002, Wittig was elected chief financial officer (CFO) by the partners in the global executive committee of Roland Berger. In 2006, the partners confirmed his mandate. Wittig was elected the CEO of Roland Berger Strategy Consultants unanimously by 180 partners in 2010.

During his work as a consultant his areas of expertise were focused on corporate finance and turnaround management with the industrial focuses of aviation/transportation as well as financial services.

Wittig stepped back in May 2013 due to health reasons. 

Martin C. Wittig has held a lectureship at the University of St. Gallen since 2007.

The Federal Foreign Office of Germany appointed Wittig to the Honorary Consul of Germany for the nation of Switzerland, more accurate for the Canton of Schwyz and the Canton of Zurich.

References

External links 
 Interview with the former CEO Burkhard Schwenker and Martin C. Wittig, translation of an interview original published in WirtschaftsWoche, 22 July 2010
 Hans-Jürgen Klesse: Where the new boss of Roland Berger have to charge (in German), WirtschaftsWoche, 22 July 2010

German chief executives
1964 births
Living people
RWTH Aachen University alumni